Gregory Rock is a rock that outcrops above the ice slopes of western Hershey Ridge,  west-southwest of Linwood Peak, in the Ford Ranges of Marie Byrd Land, Antarctica. It was mapped by the United States Geological Survey from surveys and U.S. Navy air photos, 1959–65, and was named by the Advisory Committee on Antarctic Names for Elmer D. Gregory, aviation maintenance line crew supervisor at Williams Field, McMurdo Sound, during Operation Deep Freeze 1967.

References

Rock formations of Marie Byrd Land